Rasahus is a Neotropical genus of assassin bugs (Reduviidae); 26 species have been described.

Partial species list

Rasahus biguttatus (Say, 1832) 	
Rasahus hamatus (Fabricius, 1781) 	
Rasahus scutellaris (Fabricius, 1787) 	
Rasahus sulcicollis (Serville, 1831) 	
Rasahus thoracicus (Stål, 1872)

References

Reduviidae